This page presents a list of certified stroke centers in the United States, by certification level, from highest (comprehensive), to lowest (acute). It provides the state, the hospital name, the city, the county, expiration of certification (if available), date cited, and references:

Comprehensive stroke centers

Thrombectomy-ready stroke centers

Primary stroke centers

Acute stroke ready hospitals

References 

Stroke centers
Centers